Mallplaza Trujillo is a shopping mall in Trujillo city, Peru. It was opened on November 30, 2007. It is Located in Mansiche avenue near the old locality of San Salvador de Mansiche at northwest the Historic Centre of Trujillo. This mall is the largest in the city and one of the largest in the country. In this shopping center in November 2012 was held the second Gastronomic Fair in Trujillo called Sabe a Peru.

Stores in the mall
This mall has the following anchor stores:
Falabella
Ripley
Paris
Tottus
Sodimac
Claro
Movistar
Cinemark
Coney Park

Related companies
Open Plaza Los Jardines
Real Plaza Trujillo

See also

Historic Centre of Trujillo
Chan Chan
Huanchaco
Puerto Chicama
Chimu
Pacasmayo beach
Plaza de Armas of Trujillo
Moche
Víctor Larco Herrera District
Vista Alegre
Buenos Aires
Las Delicias beach
Independence of Trujillo
Wall of Trujillo
Santiago de Huamán
Lake Conache
Marinera Festival
Trujillo Spring Festival
Wetlands of Huanchaco
Association of Breeders and Owners of Paso Horses in La Libertad
Salaverry beach
Puerto Morín
Virú culture
Marcahuamachuco
Wiracochapampa

References

External links
 Location of Mall Aventura Plaza Trujillo (Wikimapia)
 "Huaca de la luna and Huaca del sol"
 "Huacas del Sol y de la Luna Archaeological Complex", Official Website
 Information on El Brujo Archaeological Complex
 Chan Chan World Heritage Site, UNESCO
 Chan Chan conservation project
 Website about Trujillo, Reviews, Events, Business Directory
 Municipality of Trujillo

Multimedia
 
 
 
 Gallery pictures of Trujillo by Panoramio, Includes Geographical information by various authors
 Colonial Trujillo photos

Malls in Trujillo, Peru
2007 establishments in Peru
Shopping malls established in 2007